Events from the year 1312 in the Kingdom of Scotland.

Incumbents
Monarch – Robert I

Events
 29 October – the Treaty of Inverness between Robert the Bruce of Scotland and Haakon V of Norway reaffirmed the Treaty of Perth (1266).  Bruce personally represented Scotland at Inverness.

Deaths 

 Reginald le Chen (born c. 1235)

See also

 Timeline of Scottish history

References

 
Years of the 14th century in Scotland
Wars of Scottish Independence